was a Japanese aristocrat and statesman of the Nara period. He reached the court rank of Junior Second Rank and the position of Minister of the Right (udaijin), and was posthumously promoted to Junior First Rank. He was also called .

Life 
Fujiwara no Kuromaro (藤原黒麻呂) was born as the son of kugyō Fujiwara no Otomaro in 727. He is later known as Fujiwara no Korekimi.

After his uncle Fujiwara no Nakamaro's rebellion in 764, Korekimi served successively as governor of Harima Province and Yamashiro Province. He rose rapidly in the court of Empress Shōtoku.

Shortly after Kanmu's ascension to the throne in 781, a number of important officials since Kōnin's time, including sadaijin Fujiwara no Uona, udaijin Ōnakatomi no Kiyomaro, dainagon Isonokami no Yakatsugu, and udaijin Fujiwara no Tamaro, died or left office, and Korekimi was again rapidly promoted.

Korekimi died in 789, at the age of 63.

Personality 

According to the Shoku Nihongi, Korekimi had a large build and majestic presence. He was a capable official, well versed in the governmental affairs of the day, who made decisions quickly and without delay.

Genealogy 

Father: 
Second son: 
Third son: 
Son: 
Unknown wife:
Son: 
Daughter: , wife of Emperor Kanmu, mother of Prince Iyo

Notes

References 

Fujiwara clan
727 births
789 deaths
People of Nara-period Japan